Malihah Subdistrict  is a subdistrict of Markaz Rif Dimashq District in the Rif Dimashq Governorate of Syria. The administrative centre is the town of al-Malihah. Neighbouring subdistricts are Kafr Batna to the north, Jaramana and Babbila to the west, Nashabieh and al-Ghizlaniyah to the east.

At the 2004 census, the subdistrict had a population of 56,652.

The subdistrict, much like the rest of Eastern Ghouta was under rebel control, however was retaken by government forces in 2015 after the Battle of Al-Malihah.

Cities, towns and villages

References 

Markaz Rif Dimashq District